The 1972 Ohio State Buckeyes football team was an American football team that represented the Ohio State University in the 1972 Big Ten Conference football season. The Buckeyes compiled a 9–2 record, including the 1973 Rose Bowl in Pasadena, California, where they lost 42–17 to the USC Trojans.

Schedule

Depth chart

Coaching staff
 Woody Hayes – Head Coach (22nd year)
 George Chaump – Offense (5th year)
 George Hill – Defensive Coordinator (2nd year)
 Rudy Hubbard – Running Backs (5th year)
 Charles Clausen – Defense Line (2nd year)
 Edward Ferkany – Offensive Line / Punter  (1st year)
 Rudy Hubbard – Running Backs (5th year)
 John Mummey – Quarterbacks (4th year)
 Ralph Staub – Tackles / Tight ends / Kickers (3rd year)
 Dick Walker – Defensive Backs (4th year)

Rankings

Game summaries

Iowa

North Carolina

Ohio State was the only team to beat the Tar Heels in 1972.

Archie Griffin set the school single game rushing record in just his second game.

California

Illinois

Indiana

Wisconsin

Minnesota

Michigan State

Northwestern

Michigan

Ohio State made two goal line stands, one in each half, to hold on to the 14–11 victory. The first came just before halftime as Dennis Franklin fumbled on fourth down at the two. In the fourth quarter, Randy Gradishar stopped Franklin on a sneak from the one. The Buckeyes' fans tore down the goal posts with 13 seconds remaining.

vs. No. 1 USC (Rose Bowl)

Draft picks

References

Ohio State
Ohio State Buckeyes football seasons
Big Ten Conference football champion seasons
Ohio State Buckeyes football